"Like Jesus Does" is a song written by Casey Beathard and Monty Criswell and recorded by American country music artist Eric Church. It was released in January 2013 as the fifth and final single from Church's 2011 album Chief. It was also his eighth consecutive single to be certified gold by the RIAA. It is the only song on any of Church’s albums that he himself is not credited as a writer.

Content
The song is a mid-tempo ballad in which the narrator says that his lover accepts his personality and "loves [him] like Jesus does".

Critical reception
Giving it 3.5 stars out of 5, Billy Dukes of Taste of Country praised the lyrics and "vulnerability", but criticized the "plodding melody".

Commercial performance
The song has sold 509,000 copies in the United States as of June 2013.  It was certified Gold by the RIAA on June 13, 2013, and then Platinum on November 11, 2016 for a million units in sales and streams.

Music video
"Like Jesus Does" was directed by John Peets premiered on CMT and GAC in February 2013.

Chart performance

Year-end charts

Certifications

References

2013 singles
Eric Church songs
Songs written by Casey Beathard
Song recordings produced by Jay Joyce
EMI Records singles
2011 songs
Songs written by Monty Criswell
Country ballads
2010s ballads